Vyacheslav Vladimirovich Lyskov (born 2 March 1988) is a former Russian football defender.

Club career
He played in the Russian Football National League for FC Zvezda Irkutsk in 2008.

External links
 

1988 births
Living people
Russian footballers
Association football defenders
FC Zvezda Irkutsk players
FC Baikal Irkutsk players